Codreanu is a Romanian surname. Notable people with the surname include:

Alexandru Codreanu (born 1965), Moldovan diplomat
Corneliu Zelea Codreanu (1899–1938), Romanian politician
Corneliu Codreanu (footballer) (born 1977), Romanian football player
Ilie Codreanu (born 1948), Romanian sport shooter
Ina Codreanu (born 1985), Moldovan beauty queen
Ion Codreanu (1891–1960), Romanian general
Ion Codreanu (politician) (1879–1949), Moldovan politician
Mihai Codreanu (1876–1957), Romanian poet
Nicolae Bosie-Codreanu (1885–1963), Bessarabian politician
Roman Codreanu (1952–2001), Romanian wrestler
Teofil Codreanu (1941–2016), Romanian footballer

See also
Codru (disambiguation)
Codreni (disambiguation)
Gheorghe Roşca Codreanu National College, Romania

Romanian-language surnames